Kom-el-Gir is an archaeological site in the Western Delta of modern Egypt. The site lies about 5 km nort-east of the ancient town Buto and is about 20 hectare large. The town is so far little researched. A geophysical survey, test excavations and drill borings have provided some information. There are two big enclosures, one perhaps for a temple and another one for a late Roman military camp. The overall plan of the settlement seems to follow a grid pattern. Pottery found on the surface dates mostly from the fourth to seventh century AD.

See also
List of ancient Egyptian sites, including sites of temples

References 

Archaeological sites in Egypt
Former populated places in Egypt
Nile Delta
Roman towns and cities in Egypt